The four public high schools of Rockford, Illinois are:

Auburn High School
East High School
Guilford High School
Jefferson High School

The seven public middle schools of Rockford, Illinois, USA are:
RESA Middle School (formerly Rockford Environmental Science Academy)
Lincoln Middle School (originally Abraham Lincoln Junior High School)
Eisenhower Middle School
West Middle School (Rockford West High School 1940–1989)
Flinn Middle School (Thomas Jefferson High School 1969–1978)
Kennedy Middle School
Thurgood Marshall Middle School (houses Renaissance Gifted Academy program)

External links
https://web.archive.org/web/20070518172839/http://webs.rps205.com/schools/home.html

Public middle schools in Illinois
Schools in Rockford, Illinois
Public high schools in Illinois
Schools in Winnebago County, Illinois